Shirley Hankins (born November 9, 1931) is an American politician who served in the Washington House of Representatives from the 8th district from 1981 to 1990 and from 1995 to 2009 and in the Washington State Senate from the 8th district in 1990.

References

1931 births
Living people
Republican Party members of the Washington House of Representatives
Republican Party Washington (state) state senators
Women state legislators in Washington (state)